Leopoldo Roberto García Peláez Benítez (9 March 1944 – 23 January 2023), known professionally as Polo Polo, was a Mexican comedian known internationally for his elaborate joke telling and narration. His style, mainly in first person as a supposed personal experience, in conjunction with explicit language and sexual nature, word play, and double entendres (often, in the process cracking jokes within jokes, delivering witty lines and quips) oriented mainly to adult audiences.

Biography 
Leopoldo was born in León, Guanajuato, Mexico, in a family dedicated to the shoe industry. After devoting several years to the family business, he discovered his humorous vocation, which led at first to work in small establishments without payment.

The popularity of Polo Polo gradually increased, and in 1976 he moved to a bigger club called Keops Nightclub where his shows were presented every night with all tickets sold out. He was known for playing Tennis at the well known International Tennis Club in Mexico City; there he used to play Doubles and bet in almost every match; memorable ones include the one he and his beloved partner “Pepe” lost against “GonZo” and Mr. Chitiva during the Club Tournament.. but in a case his popularity reached new heights. For many consecutive years, the spectacle of Polo Polo was a hallmark of the nightclub "Khufu", until in 1986 he had the opportunity to perform in the largest room in Mexico called Crown Hall Crown Hotel Plaza, and other mass events.

In addition, the actor recorded his first live album with record company Musart, entitled The Trip to Spain. Despite the lack of radio broadcasting (due to the explicit content of the "blue" material), the album sold over 100,000 copies. This period of unparalleled success and activity is most memorable for Polo Polo, as it is when he set the record for the show with the longest duration, which remains in effect to date.

The decade of the 80s was marked by his constant appearances on late-night television, and he was in demand throughout Mexico, including a debut coming out of the territory of Mexico. His first appearance in United States was in 1988, invited by the Exclusive Artist Productions in the Super Club Chache Hollywood where their presentations played to packed houses for 10 days.

In the 90s Polo Polo was becoming one of the favorites of the public and continued to travel in Mexico and the United States. 3–4 December 1994, Polo Polo presented two shows at the Grand Olympic Auditorium Los Angeles, California with attendance records. Similar situation repeated itself at the Sahara Hotel & Casino Las Vegas etc. In Mexico, the most exclusive nightclubs and the Premier, the Patio, the Teatro Blanquita and among the others, demand in giant proportions, while the comedian is bringing to more and more sales record productions. At the end of the decade, Polo Polo conducted a television show called Con Ganas which was short-lived, despite its popular success. Official Autobiography

By the year 2000, Polo Polo was an example of a successful career, in which the comedian had combined performance in movies, plays, and the presentation of his comedy shows. Some time later he participated in the program "La Escuelita VIP" produced by fellow comedian Jorge Ortiz de Pinedo.

Polo Polo died on 23 January 2023, at the age of 78.

Albums
Viaje a España
Polo Polo, Vol. 2
Polo Polo, Vol. 3
Polo Polo, Vol. 4
Polo Polo, Vol. 5
Polo Polo, Vol. 6
Polo Polo, Vol. 7
Polo Polo, Vol. 8
Polo Polo, Vol. 9
Polo Polo, Vol. 10
Polo Polo, Vol. 11
Polo Polo, Vol. 12
Polo Polo, Vol. 13
Polo Polo, Vol. 14
Polo Polo, Vol. 15
Mejor y Algo Más: 25 Aniversario
Colección en Vivo
Show en Vivo 2004
Show en Vivo 2005
Lo Mejor de Polo Polo

See also
Albur

References

External links
 Polo Polo's official website
 
 

1944 births
2023 deaths
20th-century Mexican people
Mexican male comedians
20th-century comedians
Mexican comedians
21st-century Mexican people
21st-century comedians
People from León, Guanajuato